The Guomao Community is a community in Zuoying District, Kaohsiung, Taiwan.

History
The Guomao Community in its present form originated from a military dependents' village which was originally built in the 1960s and which was then the largest such village in Taiwan. The residents of Guomao Community were subsequently relocated from said village into 13 high-rise residential apartments constructed between 1981 and 1985.

Facilities
The area is a self-sufficient community in which various daily amenities are found, from barbershops, markets, restaurants, shops, etc.

Transportation
The area is accessible within walking distance south west of Zuoying–Jiucheng Station of Taiwan Railways.

Notable residents
 Chao Fong-pang
 Gua Ah-leh

References

Populated places in Taiwan
Geography of Kaohsiung
Society of Taiwan
Zuoying District